This Is My Dinner is the ninth studio album by American band Sun Kil Moon. It was released in November 2018 under Caldo Verde Records.

Track listing

References

2018 albums
Sun Kil Moon albums
Caldo Verde Records albums